Choi Seung-hoon (born 1 May 2008), is a South Korean actor.

Filmography

Television series

Web series

Film

Television shows

Awards and nominations

References

External links 
 
 
 

2008 births
Living people
21st-century South Korean male actors
South Korean male child actors
South Korean male television actors
South Korean male film actors
Male actors from Seoul
Boys Planet contestants